Asian Argentine, are Argentine citizens or residents of Asian ancestry. The vast majority trace their ancestry to West Asia, primarily Lebanon and Syria, and East Asia, namely China and Japan. Though there are other communities of South Asian or Southeast Asian origin as well. Asian-Argentines settled in Argentina in large numbers during several waves of immigration in the twentieth century.

History 

The first Asian Argentines were Filipinos and were fellow subjects under Spanish colonization. Eventually, Filipinos joined the Argentines in the Argentine war of independence. Filomeno V. Aguilar Jr. in his paper: “Manilamen and seafaring: engaging the maritime world beyond the Spanish realm”, that in the case of the Argentine war of independence wherein an Argentine of French descent, Hypolite Bouchard, who was a privateer for the Argentine army, when he laid siege to Monterey California, his second ship, the Santa Rosa which was captained by the American Peter Corney, had a multi-ethnic crew which included Filipinos. Mercene, writer of the Book “Manila Men”, proposes that those Manilamen were recruited in San Blas, an alternative port to Acapulco Mexico where several Filipinos had settled during the Manila-Acapulco Galleon trade era. 

In the 19th century, Argentina saw a wave of West Asian immigrants, particularly from Lebanon and Syria (who were provinces of the Ottoman Empire at the time) due to the 1860 Mount Lebanon civil war. East Asian immigrants, particularly the Japanese came largely from Okinawa Prefecture in small numbers during the early twentieth century. The overthrow of Juan Perón in 1955 precipitated a long period of unrest and economic instability that stemmed Japanese immigration after 1960. The second wave consisted primarily of Korean entrepreneurs, settling in Buenos Aires during the 1960s, and the third wave was mostly composed of Chinese entrepreneurs, who settled in Buenos Aires during the 1990s.

By the later half of the 20th century, Asian Argentines were active in politics, with an example of a political party being a special Unidad Básica (Peronist) party office under the name Unión de Residentes Taiwaneses Justicialistas ("Union of Justicialist Taiwanese Residents) at the heart of Buenos Aires's Chinatown Arribeños & Mendoza. This branch later closed, presumably as assimilation continued, while a regular Unidad Básica opened across the street.

Society 

Today, there are over 1 million Asian Argentines, the largest being those of Lebanese and Syrian descent, who total at around 3.5 million. The Lebanese alone are estimated to be about 1.5 million, The Chinese are next with around 120,000 of Chinese descent, 65,000 of Japanese descent, and 25,000 of Korean descent. 

There are an estimated 1 million Arabic speakers in Argentina, the most in Latin America.

Koreans live primarily in the Balvanera and Flores (where the Koreatown is located) districts of Buenos Aires, and are mainly involved in the manufacturing and selling of textiles.

Meanwhile, many Chinese live in Chinatown, which also has a Buddhist temple in Belgrano. Many are involved with grocery retailing, which has caused Chinese-owned stores to become a common feature of Buenos Aires.

Younger generations of Chinese-Argentines (dubbed ArgenChinos) have readily adopted local ways, with some becoming celebrities, including athletes, a film director and an anchorwoman.

The Japanese-Argentine community, located mostly in Pablo Nougués city where a large temple was built, has fully integrated themselves into Argentine society today. Sources believe that 78% of the 4th generation Japanese-Argentine community is of mixed European ancestry, while the 3rd generation is 66% mixed, and a majority of them have non-Japanese ancestors and relatives. The Japanese-Argentine community is less visible due to the intermixing with the European immigrants that have also settled in Argentina like the Italians, Spaniards, German, French, Irish, Polish and Swiss. Today they are one of the most distinguishable communities in Argentina because of their mixed race. Many of their Asian features are almost not visible due to their ancestry. In Buenos Aires, the "Jardín Japonés" (Japanese Garden and Teahouse) has become a traditional landmark of the city since its opening 30 years ago.

Other Asian-Argentines include smaller clusters of ethnic Laotians, Thai, Cambodian, Vietnamese and Hmong, most of whom arrived in the aftermath of conflict in Southeast Asia in the 1970s. They run restaurants, small groceries and vending stands, or are involved in agricultural work. After arriving in Argentina, Lao community settled in Misiones, where the Argentine government provided land and the UN provided $10,000 in financial assistance to each family. In 1997, a Lao temple, Wat Rattanarangsiyaram, was constructed in Posadas.

Discrimination 
Historically, immigrants from the Levant region of Western Asia, particularly the Lebanese and Syrians, have faced some discrimination. In 1910, Senator Manuel Lainez presented a project to expel Lebanese and Syrian immigrants regardless of their religious background (Christian, Jewish, etc), but was stopped by Joaquín V. González. González argued that they were the most "European" in Asia and hard-working. Though this did not stop certain discrimination against them.

Presently, the reputation of the East Asian community in the country has been jeopardized due to allegations of corrupt business practices. Investigations within Korean-Argentine textile factories and stores have shown that illegal workers from Bolivia were employed in these places. Because of this, many Korean-Argentines feel that their community has been unfairly targeted due to their economic success.

Another incident occurred in June 2006, when the union of truck drivers began a boycott of Chinese-owned stores. This was due to an alleged gun-related incident between a driver and a store owner, which involved illegal firearms. Shortages in stores were reported due to a lack of deliveries until the boycott was officially lifted the following month.

Notable people 
Juliana Awada, former First Lady of Argentina; Lebanese Argentine
 Chanty, (born Maria Chantal Videla), actress and member of the South Korean girl group, Lapillus; Filipino Argentine
Carlos Balá, actor of Lebanese descent
Carlos Menem, lawyer and politician, former president of Argentina, Syrian Argentine
Mario Alberto Ishii, politician; Japanese Argentine
María Kodama, writer with Japanese father
Leonardo Nam, actor; Korean Argentine
Annabel, singer
Liu Song, tennis player; Chinese Argentine
Jessica Michibata Japanese model
María Eugenia Suárez, actress with a Japanese grandmother

See also 

Chinese Argentines & Overseas Chinese
Japanese Argentines & Japanese diaspora
Koreans in Argentina & Korean diaspora
Indians in Argentina & Indian diaspora
Laotian diaspora
Lebanese Argentines & Lebanese diaspora
Syrian Argentines & Syrian diaspora
Arab Argentines

Notes

References
 Masterson, Daniel M. and Sayaka Funada-Classen. (2004), The Japanese in Latin America: The Asian American Experience. Urbana, Illinois: University of Illinois Press. ;

External links 
Centenary of the Japanese immigration to Argentina Clarín 
Migration Historical Overview - Argentina

 
Ethnic groups in Argentina
 

ms:Orang Argentina Asia